Valeriy Fyodorovich Raenko (15 September 1955 – 5 May 2021) was a Russian politician. A member of the United Russia party, he served as Chairman of the Legislative Assembly of Kamchatka Krai from 2011 to 2021.

Biography
Raenko was born on a farm in the Krasnosulinsky District of the Russian SFSR. He graduated from the Rostov State Medical University with a degree in epidemiology. He worked as a physician from 1984 to 1997 in Karaginsky and Milkovsky. From 1997 to 2007, he served as Deputy Chairman of the Kamchatka Krai Department of Health.

In 2007, Raenko was elected to the Legislative Assembly of Kamchatka Krai. On 19 December 2011, he became chairman. He was re-elected in 2016. Simultaneously, he was Secretary of the United Russia party in Kamchatka Krai.

Valeriy Raenko died on 5 May 2021, at the age of 65 following a long illness.

Distinctions
Medal of the Order "For Merit to the Fatherland" Second Class (2015)
Order of Honour (2021)

References

1955 births
2021 deaths
21st-century Russian politicians
Russian epidemiologists
United Russia politicians
Recipients of the Order of Honour (Russia)
Rostov State Medical University alumni
People from Krasnosulinsky District
Recipients of the Medal of the Order "For Merit to the Fatherland" II class
People from Kamchatka Krai